Vera Nikolayevna Pashennaya (in marriage – Gribunina; 7 (19) in September 1887, Moscow, Russia – October 28, 1962, Moscow) was a Russian theater and film actress. She joined the CPSU in 1954.

Biography 
Vera Pashennaya was born in the family of the famous actor Nikolay Roshchin-Insarov (1861 — 1899, this surname is Pashenny). Her sister, actress Yekaterina Roshchina-Insarov, emigrated in 1919.

Selected filmography
 Polikushka (1922)
 Wolves and Sheep (1953)
 The Idiot (1958)

Awards
People's Artist of the USSR (1937)
Order of Lenin (1961)
USSR State Prize (1943).

References

External links
 

1887 births
1962 deaths
Actresses from Moscow
Soviet film actresses
Soviet stage actresses
People's Artists of the USSR
Stalin Prize winners
Lenin Prize winners
Communist Party of the Soviet Union members
Burials at Novodevichy Cemetery